Lercara Friddi is a comune (municipality) in the Metropolitan City of Palermo in the Italian region Sicily, located about  southeast of Palermo.

Founded in 1595 by local feudataries, it is on the slopes of Madore Hill, between the valleys of Fiumetorto and Platani rivers. In the past it was an important mining centre, the only one in the province of Palermo where sulphur was excavated.

On December 25, 1893, eleven people were killed in the  Lercara Friddi massacre during the Fasci Siciliani uprising after a rally of peasants and sulphur miners that asked for the abolition of taxes and better working conditions.

Notable people
Andrea Finocchiaro Aprile (1878–1964), politician 
Mauro Picone (1885–1977), mathematician
Anthony Martin Sinatra (1892–1969), professional boxer and father of singer,Frank Sinatra (1915–1998)
Lucky Luciano (1897–1962), crime boss
Pietro Scaglione (1906–1971), magistrate
Nicolò Nicolosi (1912–1986), football player and manager
Pietro Lo Forte (1920–2004), musician
Frédéric François (b. 1950), singer-songwriter
Daniel Bellino-Zwicke (b. 1958), cookbook author

References

External links
 

GRANDMA BELLINO'S COOKBOOK by Daniel Bellin Z .. 
 https://www.amazon.com/Grandma-Bellinos-Italian-Cookbook-Grandmother-ebook/dp/B0128Z1BFM

Municipalities of the Metropolitan City of Palermo
1595 establishments in Italy
1595 establishments in the Spanish Empire